Inna Poluškina (born 7 July 1984, in Riga) is a Latvian long-distance runner who specialises in the 3000 metres.

Biography
Poluškina has won championships in the 1500 m, 3000 m, 5000 m, 10,000 m and half marathon categories. 

In 2008, she set Latvian record in 3000 m steeplechase and did Olympic B normative.

Achievements

Personal bests

External links

1984 births
Living people
Latvian female middle-distance runners
Latvian female long-distance runners
Latvian female steeplechase runners
Athletes from Riga
Athletes (track and field) at the 2008 Summer Olympics
Olympic athletes of Latvia